Pizza Jerk is a pizzeria with three locations in Portland, Oregon. Tommy Habetz opened the original restaurant in 2015.

History
Tommy Habetz opened the first Pizza Jerk in 2015, replacing a Bunk Sandwiches restaurant. There were some delays to opening, following an initial announcement in 2014. Ben Hufford and Brandon Smyth have also been named co-owners. The original Pizza Jerk caught fire in June, re-opening in September.

A second location opened in southeast Portland's Buckman neighborhood in 2018.

There were three Pizza Jerk locations, as of December 2021.

Reception
Bon Appetit named Pizza Jerk one of the country's "50 Best New Restaurants". Thrillist named the restaurant one the best pizzerias in the U.S. Portland Monthly included the pizzeria in a list of the city's best new restaurants of 2016. Kara Stokes included Pizza Jerk in Eater Portland's 2021 overview of recommended eateries in northeast Portland's Cully neighborhood. In 2022, the website's Janey Wong called Pizza Jerk a "punk rock pizzeria".

See also
 Pizza in Portland, Oregon

References

External links

 
 

2015 establishments in Oregon
Buckman, Portland, Oregon
Cully, Portland, Oregon
Pizzerias in Portland, Oregon
Restaurants established in 2015
Southwest Portland, Oregon